Ashleigh Marguerretthe Krystalle Nordstrom Samson (born December 26, 1998), known professionally as Ashley Ortega, is a Filipino-German actress and professional figure skater, who is well known for her roles in Dormitoryo and My Destiny on GMA Network. She is formerly a co-host of the variety show Wowowin.

Career
Ortega started appearing in television at the age of 12, where she first did commercials for GMA Network, and then eventually went into acting. She was also crowned as Ms. Olive-C 2014 Campus Model. Ortega is also a professional figure skater. She started skating at the age of 4 and competed in different countries like Thailand and Malaysia.

Personal life
Ashley Ortega was born as Ashleigh Marguerretthe Krystalle Nordstrom Samson in San Fernando, La Union on December 26, 1998, to a Filipino-German mother and Spanish-Filipino father. She is from San Fernando, La Union, her mother's hometown. She has an older brother, and younger sister, Alyssa. She went to Immaculate Conception Academy in her grade school years. She is currently studying interior design at SoFA Design Institute.

Filmography

Television

Film

References

External links

1998 births
Living people
Filipino child actresses
Filipino people of German descent
Filipino people of Spanish descent
Filipino television actresses
GMA Network personalities